Lucre District may refer to:

 Lucre District, Aymaraes, Peru
 Lucre District, Quispicanchi, Peru